Damir Džumhur was the defending champion but chose not to defend his title.

Scott Griekspoor won the title after defeating Félix Auger-Aliassime 6–4, 6–4 in the final.

Seeds

Draw

Finals

Top half

Bottom half

References
Main Draw
Qualifying Draw

Internationaux de Tennis de Blois - Singles
2018 Singles